Shannon Burke may refer to:

 Shannon Burke, host of the Shannon Burke Show, a radio show on WTKS Real Radio in Orlando, Florida
 Shannon Burke (writer) (born 1966), American novelist and screenwriter